Fulgiconus  is a synonym of Conus (Phasmoconus) Mörch, 1852 represented as Conus Linnaeus, 1758 This name was used for a genus  of sea snails, marine gastropod mollusks in the family Conidae, the cone snails and their allies.

Species list
This list of species is based on the information in the World Register of Marine Species (WoRMS) list. Species within the genus Fulgiconus include:

 Fulgiconus exiguus (Lamarck, 1810): synonym of  Conus exiguus Lamarck, 1810
 Fulgiconus goudeyi (Monnier & Limpalaër, 2012): synonym of Conus goudeyi (Monnier & Limpalaër, 2012)
 Fulgiconus marielae (Rehder & Wilson, 1975): synonym of Conus marielae Rehder & Wilson, 1975
 Fulgiconus moluccensis (Küster, 1838): synonym of Conus moluccensis Küster, 1838
 Fulgiconus vappereaui (Monteiro, 2009): synonym of Conus vappereaui Monteiro, 2009

References

Further reading 
 Kohn A. A. (1992). Chronological Taxonomy of Conus, 1758-1840". Smithsonian Institution Press, Washington and London.
 Monteiro A. (ed.) (2007). The Cone Collector 1: 1-28.
 Berschauer D. (2010). Technology and the Fall of the Mono-Generic Family The Cone Collector 15: pp. 51-54
 Puillandre N., Meyer C.P., Bouchet P., and Olivera B.M. (2011), Genetic divergence and geographical variation in the deep-water Conus orbignyi complex (Mollusca: Conoidea)'', Zoologica Scripta 40(4) 350–363.

External links
 To World Register of Marine Species
  Gastropods.com: Conidae setting forth the genera recognized therein.

Conidae